This is a list of La Liga winning football managers.

Miguel Muñoz has won the tournament on a record nine occasions, always with Real Madrid. Enrique Fernández, Helenio Herrera and Johan Cruyff have won the title on four occasions.

Seasons and winning managers

By individual

By nationality

References

 
Spain league champions